Sawan Serasinghe (born 21 February 1994) is a former badminton player from Australia. He won seven Oceania Championships titles, five in the men's doubles and two in the mixed doubles. Serasinghe competed in the men's doubles event at the 2016 Summer Olympics alongside Matthew Chau.

Career 
Serasinghe started playing badminton since the age of five, he was born in Galle, Sri Lanka, and moved to Australia when he was 11-years-old. He trains at the National Training Centre in Melbourne, and took out back-to-back Oceania Championships titles with Chau in 2015 and 2016. The 22-year-old also won the 2014 Sydney International Challenge mixed doubles with Setyana Mapasa, against some of the best players in the world. The Melburnian's first international experience was at the 2013 Australian Youth Olympic Festival where he competed in the men's doubles with Chau and also took the court in the men's singles competition.

He made his first Olympic appearance at the 2016 Summer Olympics, competing in the men's doubles with Matthew Chau. They headed into Rio as the 46th highest ranked pairing in the world, and were eliminated in the group stages after losing each of their matches against South Korea, Russia, and Chinese Taipei.

Off the court, Serasinghe holds a Bachelor of Business Information Systems degree from Monash University.

Achievements

Oceania Championships 
Men's doubles

Mixed doubles

BWF Grand Prix (1 runner-up) 
The BWF Grand Prix has two levels, the BWF Grand Prix and Grand Prix Gold. It is a series of badminton tournaments sanctioned by the Badminton World Federation (BWF) since 2007.

Mixed doubles

  BWF Grand Prix Gold tournament
  BWF Grand Prix tournament

BWF International Challenge/Series (6 titles, 3 runners-up) 
Men's doubles

Mixed doubles

  BWF International Challenge tournament
  BWF International Series tournament
  BWF Future Series tournament

References

External links 

 
 
 
 
 
 
 

1994 births
Living people
Sportspeople from Galle
Sportspeople from Melbourne
Sri Lankan emigrants to Australia
Australian people of Sri Lankan descent
Australian male badminton players
Badminton players at the 2016 Summer Olympics
Olympic badminton players of Australia
Badminton players at the 2018 Commonwealth Games
Commonwealth Games competitors for Australia
Sportsmen from Victoria (Australia)
Monash University alumni